Dan Monahan (born July 20, 1955) is an American actor, best known for his role as Edward "Pee Wee" Morris in the 1980s Porky's trilogy of teen films. He appeared in Only When I Laugh and Porky's in 1981.

Early and personal life
Monahan graduated from Olmsted Falls High School in Olmsted Falls, Ohio. Then he majored in business and drama at Ohio University.

Monahan married a teacher, Sharon Killius, in September 1982, and has a daughter.

Filmography 
 Paradiso Blu (1980) - Peter
 The Adventures of Huckleberry Finn (1981) - Tom Sawyer
 Only When I Laugh (1981) - Jason
 Porky's (1981) - Edward "Pee Wee" Morris
 Porky's II: The Next Day (1983) - Edward "Pee Wee" Morris
 Up the Creek (1984) - Max
 Porky's Revenge! (1985) - Edward "Pee Wee" Morris
 From the Hip (1987) - Larry
 The Prince of Pennsylvania (1988) - Tommy Rutherford
 The Night Flier (1997) - Merton Morrison
 Shattered Illusions (1998) - Mark
 Baby Geniuses (1999) - Reporter
 Romeo and Juliet (2000) - Friar Lawrence
 Daddies' Girls (To Be Announced)

References

External links 
 

1955 births
Living people
American male film actors
Male actors from Ohio
People from Olmsted Falls, Ohio